Shashanka (IAST: Śaśāṃka) was the first independent king of a unified polity in the Bengal region, called the Gauda Kingdom and is a major figure in Bengali history. He reigned in the 7th century, some historians place his rule between circa 600 CE and 636/7 CE, whereas other sources place his reign between 590 and 625 CE.

Shashanka, is credited with creating the Bengali calendar. The term Bangabda (Bangla year) is found too in two Shiva temples many centuries older than Akbar era, suggesting that a Bengali calendar existed long before Akbar's time.

He is the contemporary of Harsha and of Bhaskaravarman of Kamarupa. His capital was at Karnasubarna, in present-day Murshidabad in West Bengal.

Contemporary sources 

There are several major contemporary sources of information on his life, including copperplates from his vassal Madhavavarma (king of Ganjam), copperplates of his rivals Harsha and Bhaskaravarman, the accounts of Banabhatta, who was a bard in the court of Harsha, and of the Chinese monk Xuanzang, and also coins minted in Shashanka's reign.

Early life 
Not much is known about the early life of Shashanka. He is said to be a Shaiva king of Gaur city. Historian D K Ganguly is reported to have concluded that he was a native of Magadha.

The same source reports that the historian Padmanath Bhattacharya took Shashanka to be a son of Mahasenagupta. R D Banerji concluded that he was descended from the Magadha Guptas. These views are opposed by other historians like B. S. Sinha and John Middleton, citing lack of evidence.

Nagendranath Basu has argued that Shashanka was the son / descendant of Raja Karnadeva, who founded the city of Karnasubarna.

Names and titles 
Shashanka's name appears in multiple forms, including Śaśānka and Śaśānka-deva. The name is derived from Sanskrit, as another name for the Moon. Śaśānka-deva therefore loosely translates to Moon god. The Hindu god Shiva is also known as Shashank Sekhar as He holds the moon on his head.

The Chinese monk Xuanzang's writings, he is mentioned as She-Shang-Kia. He is also called Śaśānka Gaur, which initially lent credence to the claim that he was descended from the later Gaur. In Sinha's Dynastic History of Magadha, the names 'Śaśānka' and 'Soma' are used interchangeably.

Rise to power 
The Gupta Empire saw a series of weak kings after the death of Skandagupta in 467 C.E. On top of that, starting circa 480 C.E. Alchon Hun armies began attacking the declining empire from multiple sides. Defence of the vast empire put a strain on the royal treasury. Though the Huns were initially driven out, the protracted invasions quickened the downfall of the Gupta kings. It may be noted that Indian archeologist Shanker Sharma has argued that the empire's end was precipitated by a massive deluge around the middle of the sixth century C.E.

Near the end of the sixth century, the empire was ruled over by a feeble ruler belonging to the Later Gupta dynasty, Mahasenagupta (r. c. 562-601 C.E.). The decline of the Gupta empire had left the disintegrating empire in chaos. Numerous local kings and rulers like Yashodharman emerged, and started vying for control of the many pieces of the former empire. Shashanka emerged as one of these ambitious local rulers, aiming to seize control of Gauda and its surrounding region.

The first mention of Shashanka is found in the 7th century hill fort Rohtasgarh in the small town of Rohtas in the kingdom of Magadha. The seal bore a curt inscription, "Mahasamanta Shashankadeva."

Some historians believe that Shashanka began his career as a feudatory chief (maha samanta) under Mahasenagupta, of the Later Gupta Dynasty. And that after the death of Mahasenagupta, Shashanka drove the later Guptas and other prominent nobles out of the region and established his own kingdom with his capital at Karnasubarna. Other historians like Sailendra Nath Sen is of the opinion that Mahasenagupta - already under pressure from the Maukharis (for failing to provide adequate protection) - wouldn't have knowingly appointed Shashanka to such an important position. Middleton (2015) argues in a similar vein that Shashanka served as maha samanta to a Gauda king, possibly Jayanaga.

Whether Shashanka was a feudatory under the Maukharis or the Guptas is not known. By 605 C.E. following Mahasenagupta's death, Shashanka had established what became known as the Gauda Kingdom. From there, he issued gold coins to celebrate his triumph, and came to be addressed as Maharajadhiraja (king of great kings).

Military campaigns and warfare 

Not many historical references to the Gauda Army are available. Like its predecessor, the Late Gupta army, Shashanka's army had infantry and cavalry units. D. C. Sircar (1990) reports that the Gauda army also fielded a strong elephant corps in Kamarupa.

Kamarupa king Bhaskaravarman describes the Gauda army as fielding a strong naval force.

Campaign against the Varmans of Kamarupa (Assam) 
It appears that between 595 and 600 C.E. the Gauda army had carried out attacks against the Varman King Susthitavarman of Kamarupa (Assam). The Varman king died early in the war, and his two sons stepped up. The Doobi Copper Plate inscriptions tell us that the Gauda army fought and defeated the king, and princes Bhaskaravarma of kamrupa And Supratisthita The princes are described as fighting a mighty elephantry force.

The princes were brought back to Gauda as prisoners but released shortly thereafter. They supposedly returned to their kingdom as feudatories under Shashanka. The younger of the two would soon turn against the Gauda.

Campaign against the Maukharis of Kanyakubja (Kanauj) 
Hans Bakker argues that the army that set out to attack the Maukharis in Kanyakubja was more of a "confederation of all those who held a grudge", and that it was led by Shashanka.

Now because the ruling dynasties of Kanyakubja and Sthaniswara were related by matrimony, Thanesar king Rajyavardhana immediately set out with 10,000 cavalrymen to recapture Kanyakubja and avenge his sister Rajyashri. Rajyavardhana fought and killed Devagupta on the way. As he continued towards Kanyakubja, he came across Shashanka's army. Circa 606 C.E. Rajyavardhana was killed by Shashanka. No conclusive evidence exists but it is possible that Shashanka, who joined the battle as an ally of Devagupta, murdered him. The only source available in this matter is the Harshacharita by Bāṇabhaṭṭa, who was a childhood friend and constant companion of Harsha; neither of these men were present at the death.

War with Harsha of Sthanisvara (Thanesar) 
Harsha succeeded his brother as ruler of Thanesar in 606 C.E. and he once again gathered the army and attacked Kannauj. Shashanka and his allies fought a major war with the then emperor of Thanesar, Harsha, and his allies. It is evident that Shashanka had to retreat from Kannauj. The result of the battle was inconclusive as Shashanka is documented to have retained dominion over his lands. Shashanka continued to rule Gauda with frequent attacks from Harsha, which he is known to have faced bravely.

Extent of kingdom 

Shashanka first established himself in Gauda and set his eyes on Magadha. Magadha at that time was under Maukhari rule, and Shashanka vowed to free it again.

Sen (1977) has shown that none other than Shashanka could have defeated the Maukhari rulers of Magadha. Next, he focused on extending his kingdom to Odissa, parts of Central Provinces, and Bihar.

Though Shashanka remains known, and referred to, as the Lord of Gauda, his kingdom included more than just that region. By the end of his reign, his domain stretched from Vanga to Bhuvanesha while in the east, his kingdom bordered Kamarupa.

Rule and administration 

Shashanka, at first glance, appears like a "warlike monarch." His endless invasions and conquests tell of a king intent upon growing his kingdom. Sen describes Shashanka as a 'military adventurer', not unlike Yasodharman. But for a pre-medieval Indian king, endless battles, regicide, revenge and intrigue are not uncommon.

Like many pre-medieval Indian kings, Shashanka is said to have grasped the importance of consolidating his position. He formed astute political alliances, notably with the Malva king, Devagupta, to counteract the combined might of the Kanauj-Thaneshwar coalition.

As king, Shashanka continued many Gupta-era traditions, e.g., making land grants to Brahmins, as evidenced by the copperplate inscriptions from the era. Gold and silver coins, known as Dinars, issued by Shashanka have also been discovered. He vigorously propagated Hinduism, and had Sakadvipi Brahmins and Vedic Brahmins invited into his kingdom, presumably from Kanyakubja, among other places.

Art and culture 
Historians argue that the unique Gauda style of composition developed with the development of poetry in the courts of the princes of Bengal. These princes of Bengal are none other than the Lords of Gauda.

Copperplate inscriptions 
Three copperplate inscriptions issued by King Shashanka have been discovered. Two of these were issued in his 8th and 10th regnal years and discovered from Midnapore. The other, known as the Egra Copperplate, was discovered near Kharagpur and bears no date.

Suppression of Buddhism 
A 12th century text states that Shashanka destroyed the Buddhist stupas of Bengal and was an oppressor of Buddhism. Shashanka is reputed to have cut the Bodhi tree where the Buddha found enlightenment, in the Mahabodhi Temple of Bodh Gaya.

Ramesh Chandra Majumdar states that this account is doubtful because it was written 500 years after the alleged persecution, and that it is "unsafe to accept the statements recorded in this book as historical". Radhagovinda Basak states that there is no reason to believe that this 12th century Buddhist author had cherished any ill feeling about 7th century Shashanka, and he may have had reasons to describe the events as they occurred.

Following his death, Shashanka was succeeded by his son, Manava, who ruled the kingdom for eight months. However, Gauda was soon divided amongst Harsha and Bhaskaravarman of Kamarupa, the latter even managing to conquer Karnasuvarna.

Legacy 

Commenting on the symbolism of Gauda, Akshay Kumar Maitreya remarked, “The whole of Gauḍa was once known as Gauḍa Desh. The Bengali language only a few days ago was known as Gauḍiya Bhasha… Even now in many parts of India Bengalis are known as Gauḍiya. So, if one attempts to write our history, one must begin with Gaur.”
  
King Shashanka's unification, and subsequent defence, of local, disparate kingdoms including Vanga, Samatata and Gauda, against the mighty king Harsha, is considered seminal in the formation of the idea, and the polity, of Bengal. Many historians and commentators argue that Shashanka was the first independent king of not only Gauda, but of Bengal. As such he is a symbolic figure in the region's aspirations for independence and self-rule.

Shashanka's feat in bringing the many tribes and kingdoms under a single flag becomes clear only after his death. Chaos broke out in Bengal with the demise of the Gauda Kingdom. In Pala inscriptions, this time is called Matsyanyayam, implying times of 'jungle rule' when big fish swallow up small fish.

It is thought that the development of the Bengali calendar took place under Shashanka's reign.

In folk and popular culture

Sarasanka Dighi (folk legend) 
Situated in present-day Midnapore, Sarasanka is a massive dighi (manmade lake) measuring over 140 acres. That is nearly equal to the total area of 80 football fields. Its aesthetics show clear influences of the Hindu Vastu Shastra school of architecture, design and aesthetics.

According to Bengali folk lore and legends, the dighi was excavated at the behest of King Shashanka. In one oral tradition: once Shashanka had been accompanying his mother to holy pilgrimage and his convoy camped at the small village of Jamuapati in Datan. There, his mother was impressed by local hospitality; she asked them why their yields were so meagre. The villagers replied that they suffered from an acute shortage of water.

So, Shashank's mother urged her son to do something for the villagers, so that they still had water during the lean season. Not one to disobey his mother's wishes, Shashanka reportedly pulled out an arrow from his sheath, and announced that he would excavate a reservoir as long as the arrow's trajectory. And thus, over a period of three years, and with help from local nobles, Sarasanka came into existence.

Shashanka (popular culture) 
Published in 1914, Shashanka is a historical novel penned by the famous Indian archaeologist Rakhaldas Bandyopadhyay, who is best known for his discoveries in Mohenjo Daro. He found Shashanka to be a potent symbol of Bengal's glorious past and future political aspirations.

See also 
 List of rulers of Bengal

References

Further reading 
 R. C. Majumdar, History of Bengal, Dacca, 1943, pp 58–68
 Sudhir R Das, Rajbadidanga, Calcutta, 1962
 P. K. Bhttacharyya, Two Interesting Coins of Shashanka, Journal of the Royal Asiatic Society of Great Britain & Ireland, London, 2, 1979

Rulers of Bengal
6th-century Indian monarchs
7th-century Indian monarchs